Facundo Bruera (born 23 September 1998) is an Argentine professional footballer who plays as a forward for Paraguayan club Club Nacional, on loan from Brown de Adrogué.

Career

Club
Bruera began his career with Estudiantes of the Argentine Primera División. In August 2017, Bruera signed his first professional contract with Estudiantes and was immediately loaned out to Primera B Nacional side Independiente Rivadavia. His senior debut came on 5 November 2017 as Independiente Rivadavia drew 2–2 with Flandria. Quilmes completed the signing of Bruera in August 2018.

International
Bruera was called up to train with the Argentina U20 team ahead of the 2016 COTIF Tournament, but he wasn't selected for the final squad by manager Ariel Paolorossi.

Career statistics
.

References

External links

1998 births
Living people
Argentine footballers
Argentine expatriate footballers
Place of birth missing (living people)
Association football forwards
Argentine Primera División players
Primera Nacional players
Paraguayan Primera División players
Estudiantes de La Plata footballers
Independiente Rivadavia footballers
Quilmes Atlético Club footballers
Club Atlético Brown footballers
Club Nacional footballers
Argentine expatriate sportspeople in Paraguay
Expatriate footballers in Paraguay